Sundacypha is a genus of jewel damselfly in the family Chlorocyphidae. There are at least two described species in Sundacypha.

Species
These two species belong to the genus Sundacypha:
 Sundacypha petiolata (Selys, 1859)
 Sundacypha striata Orr, 1999

References

Further reading

 
 
 

Chlorocyphidae
Articles created by Qbugbot